1 Chronicles 24 is the twenty-fourth chapter of the Books of Chronicles in the Hebrew Bible or the First Book of Chronicles in the Old Testament of the Christian Bible. The book is compiled from older sources by an unknown person or group, designated by modern scholars as "the Chronicler", and had the final shape established in late fifth or fourth century BCE. This chapter records the organization and departments of priests (verses 1–19) and a list of non-priestly Levites (verses 20–31). The whole chapter belongs to the section focusing on the kingship of David (1 Chronicles 9:35 to 29:30), which from chapter 22 to the end does not have any parallel in 2 Samuel.

Text
This chapter was originally written in the Hebrew language. It is divided into 31 verses.

Textual witnesses
Some early manuscripts containing the text of this chapter in Hebrew are of the Masoretic Text tradition, which includes the Aleppo Codex (10th century), and Codex Leningradensis (1008).

Extant manuscripts of a Koine Greek translation known as the Septuagint, made in the last few centuries BCE, include Codex Vaticanus (B; B; 4th century), Codex Alexandrinus (A; A; 5th century) and Codex Marchalianus (Q; Q; 6th century).

David organizes the priests (24:1–19)
This section details the organization of the priests, the highest branch of the Levites, in a more advanced and systematic manner than anywhere else in the Hebrew Bible and was adhered rigidly until the Roman period (cf. Luke 1:5). Lists of the priestly families also found partially in 1 Chronicles 9:10–; ; ; .

Verse 1
Now these are the divisions of the sons of Aaron. The sons of Aaron; Nadab, and Abihu, Eleazar, and Ithamar.
Among the four sons of Aaron, Nadab and Abihu died without children (verse 2); and the other two had to supply the "chief men of the house," of which Eleazar had sixteen, and Ithamar eight (verse 4).

Verse 3
And David distributed them, both Zadok of the sons of Eleazar, and Ahimelech of the sons of Ithamar, according to their offices in their service.
Of the two priestly families  (1 Chronicles 15:11; ; ; cf. ), Zadok represented the family of Eleazar, and Ahimelech represented the family of Ithamar, to help David organizing the priests. The Chronicler emphasizes the equal treatment of the two groups in the passage (cf 24:31; 26:13) using a procedure of drawing lots (verse 5), also in 1 Chronicles (24:31; 25:8; 26:13) and elsewhere (for examples. Nehemiah 10:35), to indicate God's hand in the distribution of the personnel.

List of the priestly divisions

Remaining Levite assignments (24:20–31)
The Levites had similar rotation schedule as the priests (verse 31),  and used the same system of drawing lots as the priests with almost the same witnesses, indicating that the Levites are considered as important as the priests.

Document witnesses for priestly divisions
Josephus wrote that David divided the Levites into twenty-four courses, sixteen of the house of Eleazar and eight of the house of Ithamar and he ordained each course to minister eight days, from Sabbath to Sabbath (Antiquities ).

Babylonian Talmud has a statement by Rabbi Hama ben Guria that "Moses instituted for Israel eight Mishmaroth ("priestly divisions")—four from [the family of] Eleazar and four from [the family of] Ithamar; Samuel increased them to sixteen; David increased them to twenty four" (Taanith 27a).

After the Temple destruction in 70 CE, there was a custom of publicly recalling the courses of the priests every Sabbath, a practice that reinforced the prestige of the priests' lineage. A manuscript discovered in the Cairo Geniza, dated 1034 CE, records a customary formula recited weekly in the synagogues, during the Sabbath day:

"Today is the holy Sabbath, the holy Sabbath unto the Lord; this day, which is the course? [Appropriate name] is the course. May the Merciful One return the course to its place soon, in our days. Amen." 
After which, they would recount the number of years that have passed since the destruction of Jerusalem, and conclude with the words: 
"May the Merciful One build his house and sanctuary, and let them say Amen."

Three stone inscriptions were discovered bearing the names of the priestly wards, their order and the name of the locality to which they had moved after the destruction of the Second Temple:
1. In 1920, a marble stone inscription was found in Ashkelon showing a partial list of the priestly wards, attesting to the existence of such plaques, perhaps mounted to the walls of synagogues.

2. In 1962 three small fragments of one Hebrew stone inscription, dated to the 3rd/4th centuries, were found in Caesarea Maritima, bearing the partial names of places associated with the priestly courses (the rest of which had been reconstructed) as follows:

This is the oldest inscription mentioning Nazareth as a location, outside the Bible and pilgrim notes.

3. In 1970 a stone inscription was found on a partially buried column in a mosque, in the Yemeni village of Bayt al-Ḥaḍir, showing ten names of the priestly wards and their respective towns and villages. The Yemeni inscription is the longest roster of names of this sort ever discovered, unto this day. The names legible on the stone column discovered by Walter W. Müller read as follows:

A seventh-century poet, Eleazar ben Killir, wrote a liturgical poem detailing the 24-priestly wards and their places of residence. Historian and geographer, Samuel Klein (1886–1940), thinks that Killir's poem proves the prevalence of this custom of commemorating the courses in the synagogues of the Land of Israel.

See also

Related Bible parts: Exodus 6, Deuteronomy 12, Numbers 3, Numbers 4, Numbers 8, 1 Chronicles 6, Ezra 3, Luke 1

Notes

References

Sources

External links
 Jewish translations:
 Divrei Hayamim I - I Chronicles - Chapter 24 (Judaica Press) translation [with Rashi's commentary] at Chabad.org
 Christian translations:
 Online Bible at GospelHall.org (ESV, KJV, Darby, American Standard Version, Bible in Basic English)
 First Book of Chronicles Chapter 24. Bible Gateway

24